David Raymond Mehan is an Australian politician who was elected to the New South Wales Legislative Assembly as the member for The Entrance  for the Labor Party at the 2015 New South Wales state election.

Mehan previously worked in the construction industry as an engineering geologist specialising in landslides and earthquakes. He also contested for the seat of Dobell in the 2004 federal election but lost to the sitting member at the time Ken Ticehurst. In addition, Mehan has previously contested for his current seat in the 2011 election.

References

 

Living people
Members of the New South Wales Legislative Assembly
Australian Labor Party members of the Parliament of New South Wales
University of Newcastle (Australia) alumni
University of Sydney alumni
Australian Army officers
21st-century Australian politicians
Year of birth missing (living people)